Munghana Lonene FM is an SABC (South African Broadcasting Cooperation) radio station broadcasting in Tsonga language in South Africa. In Tsonga, "Munghana Lonene" means "a true friend." Munghana Lonene FM is geared to listeners who understand Xitsonga. Munghana Lonene FM is branded as an "infotainment" radio station with a 50% split of music and talk. It offers an environment interactive with its listeners, providing a mixture of news, music, current affairs, talk shows, education, sport, weather and traffic. The music repertoire consists of Jazz, R&B, Kwaito, House, Gospel music and African music.

Munghana Lonene FM's broadcast areas includes Gauteng, Limpopo, eastern Mpumalanga and Mozambique.

History

On 1 February 1965, initial programmes in the Tsonga language were broadcast for listeners in the then Northern Transvaal, from the Johannesburg studios of the South African Broadcasting Corporation, at that time situated in Broadcast House, Commissioner Street. This service later became known as Radio Tsonga. On 1 February 1984 Radio Tsonga was also broadcast on medium wave from Pietersburg (now Polokwane). On 1 May of the same year, coverage was extended to listeners in Soweto via a low power FM transmitter atop the SABC building at Auckland Park.

Amongst those who managed the station is  former presenter and Radio 2000 manager, James Shikwamabane after Tsakani Baloyi left the station in 2011. Former sports presenter James Swikwambane has won more National and International Awards; he was now the station manager from May 2012 to September 2016.

From 1 December 2016, Lawrence Ubisi was the station manager till March 2021. Vongani Nkanyane is the station’s marketing manager. On 1 September 2018 the station announced Tebogo Jacko Magubane as its new Programmes Manager.

Tebogo Jacko Magubane, Rose Tshabalala and Ruth Maphophe are the station’s current Top Management managing the station with Rudzani Mashamba who is the Marketing Manager for the Limpopo Combo consisting of Munghana Lonene FM, Phalaphala FM and Thobela FM.

As of 4 February 2020, OVHD is adding SABC Radio stations on its audio banquet and Munghana Lonene FM is now part of the stations on the banquet on Channel 622.

Coverage and frequencies

Programming

Monday - Friday
01:00–05:00: Automation 
06:00–09:00: Phaphama with DJ Brian and Connizer 
05:00–06:00: Current Affairs (Tiko A Xietleli) 
09:00–12:00: Swa Risima with Khensani Nyango
12:00–13:30: Afrika wa Vulavula with Khalanga Pat Mathebula 
13:30–15:00: Dzumba na Mina with DJ Matt
15:00–17:00: Khoma Ndlela with Ike Ngobeni & Lindhiva
18:00–19:00: Current Affairs (Tiko A Xietleli)
19:00–20:00: Ta Mintlangu (Sports) with Nyiko Sithole  
20:00–21:00: Ta Vaaki with Chiechie N'wa Rivisi
21:00–22:00: Educational Programmes with Chiechie N'wa Rivisi (Fridays Rooitjie Rikhotso)
22:00–01:00: Gongomela with N’wana N’wa Gee

Saturday

01:00–05:00: Embiteni ya Vunanga Non-Stop Mixtapes
05:00–06:00: Mina Hi Mina Omnibus
06:00–07:00: Current Affairs (Tiko A Xietleli)
07:00–09:00: Saturday Breakfast with Maningi wa Ntamu 
09:00–12:00: Top 30 (Switshongo) with Mathilda Chauke
12:00–13:00: State your mind & Teen Zone with Mpfuxelelo Makaringe
12:00–15:00: Nkatsakanyo with Mchangani
15:00–18:00: Etimbaleni (Sports Live) with Rhandzu Optimus
18:00–19:00: Xitsonga Top 10 with The Quintoniser
19:00–22:00: Mantshwani with DJ Soulcrusher 
22:00–01:00: Ta Duma with Rooitjie Tshukeleni

Sunday

00:00–05:00: Non-Stop Mixtapes
05:00–06:00: Mpfumawulo wa swilombe with Ruth Maphophe
06:00–09:00: Sisimuka u vangama with Maningi wa ntamu
09:00–12:00: Lathela with Mathilda Chauke
12:00–15:00: Pyupya with Themba 'Techtonics' Chauke
15:00–18:00: Etimbaleni (Sports Live) with Rhandzu Optimus
18:00–19:00: Current Affairs (Tiko A Xietleli)
19:00–21:00: Empfuxelelweni with Thembzana Reloaded
21:00–00:00: Campus Connection with Rootjie Tshukeleni

Broadcast time
24/7

Social media
Twitter  : @Munghana
Facebook : Munghana Lonene fm: Makomba-Ndlela
Instagram : munghanalonene
YouTube   : Munghana Lonene FM

Listenership Figures

References

External links
 http://www.clumag.co.za/index.php?option=com_content&view=article&id=1205&Itemid=
 http://www.sowetanlive.co.za/sowetan/archive/2008/04/15/dj-brian-back-with-best
 http://english.people.com.cn/90001/90779/90871/7038965.html
 http://www.sabc.co.za/wps/portal/SABC/munghanalonenefm
 https://archive.today/20130421220015/http://www.rab.co.za/munghana-lonene-fm/

Radio stations in South Africa
News and talk radio stations
Mass media in Johannesburg
Mass media in Limpopo
Mass media in Mpumalanga
Mass media in North West (South African province)